Vuk is a male Slavic given name, predominantly recorded among Serbs as well as Croatians, Macedonians, Montenegrins, Slovenes. The name literally means "wolf". Vuk Karadžić, 19th-century Serbian philologist and ethnographer, explained the traditional, apotropaic use of the name: a woman who had lost several babies in succession, would name her newborn son Vuk, because it was believed that the witches, who "ate" the babies, were afraid to attack the wolves. In the Serbian epic poetry, the wolf is a symbol of fearlessness. Vuk was the 17th most popular name for boys in Serbia in the period 2003–2005.

There are many given names derived from the noun vuk. The following are male names recorded among the Serbs by the 19th century: Vukaj, Vuko, Vukoje, Vukovoj, Vukovoje, Vukal, Vukalj,  Vukajlo, Vukola, Vukel, Vukelja, Vukula, Vukan, Vukolin, Vukota, Vukić, Vukadin, Vukac, Vukas, Vuksan, Vukač, Vukašin, Vukša, Vukdrag, Vukman, Vukoman, Vukmir, Vukomir, Vukmilj, Vukoslav, Vukosav, Dobrovuk, Vučo, Vučko, Vučela, Vučan, Vučen, Vučin, Vučihna, Vučina, Vučeta, Vučić, Vučkulin, Vujo, Vujan, Vujat, Vujadin, Vujin, Vujeta, Vujčeta, Vujčin, Vujić, Vujko, Vujak, Vujica, Vujača, Vujaš, Vule, Vulina, Vulić, Vulic, and Vuleš. There are also female names derived from vuk: Vuka, Vukana, Vujana, Vukava, Vučica, Vukadinka, Vujadinka, Vukmira, Vukomirka, Vukomanka, and Vukosava. All the derivatives from vuk were regarded as apotropaic names. In the period 2003–2005, Vukašin was the 30th and Vukan the 82nd most popular name for boys in Serbia.

The name Vuk is recorded in Serbian sources dating before 1400 in the form of Vlk, with a syllabic l. Through a sound change in Serbian that took place after 1400, the syllabic l turned into the vowel u. In this way Vlk became Vuk, and by the same process the initial Vuk- and Vuč- in the derivatives developed from Vlk- and Vlč-; e.g., Vukašin from Vlkašin. The names Vujo and Vule are the bases for the derivatives starting with Vuj- and Vul-. They are formed from vuk on the same pattern as the pet names Brajo and Brale are formed from brat "brother".

The given name Vlk and its derivatives, Vlkoň, Vlček, and Vlčata for males, and Vlkava and Vlčenka for females, were recorded among the Czechs, while Wilkan was recorded among the Poles. Janusz, the Archbishop of Gniezno (1374–1382), was nicknamed Suchy Wilk or Suchowilk "dry wolf". Serbian surnames Belovuk and Bjelovuk mean "white wolf".

Notable people
Vuk Orle (fl. 1330), Serbian military commander
Vuk Kosača (d. 1359), Bosnian military commander
Vuk Kotromanić (died after 1374), Bosnian Ban
Vuk Branković (1345–1398), Serbian nobleman
Vuk Lazarević (d. 1410), Serbian royalty
Vuk Grgurević (1440–1485), Serbian despot
Vuk Krsto Frankopan (1578-1652), Hungarian-Croatian nobleman
Vuk Stefanović Karadžić (1787–1864), Serbian linguist and reformer of Serbian language
Vojvoda Vuk (1881–1916), Serbian military commander
Vuk Drašković (b. 1946), Serbian political leader
Vuk Jeremić (b. 1975), former Serbian Minister of Foreign affairs

See also
Vuković, Serbian and/or Montenegrin surname
Vukić, Serbian surname

References

Slavic masculine given names
Serbian masculine given names
Slovene masculine given names
Croatian masculine given names
Bulgarian masculine given names
Macedonian masculine given names
Montenegrin masculine given names
Slavic mythology
European witchcraft